Henry Frederick Howe (17 February 1716 – 7 October 1781) was the second son of John Howe, 1st Baron Chedworth.

Education
He was educated at John Roysse's Free School in Abingdon, (now Abingdon School). He later studied at Pembroke College, Oxford (Gen.Com.).

Peerage
He succeeded to the title in 1762 on the death of his brother and did not marry.

The family seat was Stowell Park, Gloucestershire, and he was succeeded in the barony by his nephew John Howe, 4th Baron Chedworth.

Career
He was admitted to Lincoln's Inn on 1 August 1732. His occupation in 1777 was listed as surgeon. He died on 7 October 1781.

See also
 List of Old Abingdonians

References

1716 births
1781 deaths
3
Henry
People educated at Abingdon School